Didié is a town located in the Pâ Department of Balé Province in Burkina Faso. The town has a population of 1,234.

References

External links
Satellite map at Maplandia.com

Populated places in the Boucle du Mouhoun Region
Balé Province